Vërban is a village in Viti municipality, Kosovo. These people belong to berisha tribe

Notes

References 

Villages in Viti, Kosovo